Estriol acetate benzoate (brand name Holin-Depot), or oestriol diacetate benzoate, is an estrogen medication. It is an estrogen ester, specifically, an ester of estriol.

See also
 List of estrogen esters § Estriol esters

References

Acetate esters
Benzoate esters
Estriol esters
Estrogens
Phenols
Triols